Ancaster—Dundas—Flamborough—Aldershot was a provincial electoral district in southwestern Ontario, Canada that elected one Member of the Legislative Assembly of Ontario. It was created in 1999 from Wentworth North, Burlington South and Halton Centre. It was abolished in 2007 into Ancaster—Dundas—Flamborough—Westdale, Burlington, Hamilton Centre, Hamilton Mountain and Niagara West—Glanbrook.

The riding included the municipalities of Ancaster, Dundas and Flamborough plus that part of Burlington south of a line going along King Road to the 403 to the QEW.

Members of Provincial Parliament

This riding has elected the following members of the Legislative Assembly of Ontario:

 Toni Skarica, Ontario Progressive Conservative Party (1999-2000)
 Ted McMeekin, Liberal (2000-2007)

Provincial election results

Former provincial electoral districts of Ontario
Politics of Hamilton, Ontario